Agneta Månsson is a Swedish ski orienteering competitor. At the World Ski Orienteering Championships in 1975 she won a silver medal in the individual contest, behind winner Sinikka Kukkonen, and a silver medal in the relay with the Swedish team (with team mates Lena Samuelsson and Marianne Bogestedt).

References

Swedish orienteers
Female orienteers
Ski-orienteers
Year of birth missing (living people)
Living people